The 1948 Belmont Stakes was the 80th running of the Belmont Stakes. It was the 42nd Belmont Stakes held at Belmont Park in Elmont, New York and was run on June 12, 1948. With a field of eight horses, after Coaltown was scratched, eight runners remained. Citation, the winner of that year's Kentucky Derby and Preakness Stakes won the 1 –mile race (12 f; 2.4 km) by 8 lengths over Better Self.

With the win, Citation became the eighth Triple Crown champion.

Results 

 Winning breeder: Calumet Farm (KY)

Payout 

 Based on a $2 wager.

External links 

 BelmontStakes.com

References 

Belmont Stakes races
Belmont Stakes
Belmont Stakes
Belmont Stakes